WHOP can refer to:

 WHOP (AM), a radio station at 1230 AM licensed to Hopkinsville, Kentucky
 WHOP-FM, a radio station at 98.7 FM licensed to Hopkinsville, Kentucky